Amsactoides is genus of tiger moths in the family Erebidae. The genus was erected by Shōnen Matsumura in 1927.

Species
The genus contains two species:
 Amsactoides guangxica Dubatolov & Kishida, 2009
 Amsactoides solitaria (Wileman, 1910)

Additional species may occur in Mainland Southeast Asia.

References

Spilosomina
Moth genera
Taxa named by Shōnen Matsumura